Masten Milimu Wanjala (2001 – 15 October 2021) was a Kenyan suspected serial killer. He was accused of killing 10 boys in Nairobi.

Wanjala admitted to drugging and murdering more than 10 boys since 2019, and to drinking the blood of some. He gained their confidence by pretending to be a football coach, and held some for ransom.

He was arrested on 14 July 2021, and was held at Jogoo Road police station, but had yet to be charged when he escaped from custody on 13 October. The three police officers on duty at the time were arraigned on charges of allowing and assisting his escape; they said there was a power cut at the police station that night. Two days after his escape, Wanjala was lynched by an angry mob in Mukhweya, Bungoma County, where his parents live; his parents have since disowned him.

References

2001 births
2021 deaths
2021 murders in Kenya
Escapees
Kenyan murder victims
Kenyan serial killers
Lynching deaths
Male murder victims
Male serial killers
Murdered serial killers
People from Bungoma County
People murdered in Kenya
Violence against men in Africa
Vampirism (crime)